Commonly known as the Westcoaster, the Melbourne to Hobart Ocean Yacht Race also known as M2H commences from Port Phillip, Victoria and concludes in Hobart, Tasmania. It is run by the Ocean Racing Club of Victoria.

In 2007, to honour the 100th anniversary of the first sailing of the Rudder Cup, the ORCV broke with a 35-year tradition by redirecting the Melbourne to Hobart course for the “Westcoaster” to follow the Rudder Cup Melbourne to Launceston course to their finish line at Low Head near the mouth of the Tamar River and then on to Hobart but via Banks Strait and the East Coast of Tasmania. This proved to be a race with many unique navigational challenges. Unlike the other race down the East Coast, the course took competitors close in around the coastline. Many competitors called for the race to be repeated and so the Eastcoaster was born. The course over which the Eastcoaster race is run is slightly different from the initial 2007 race to eliminate the tidal influence of Low Head and Banks Strait. The race starts from Portsea and the first course is through the Heads. The fleet will then set a course past Cape Schank for Wilson's Promontory.

Line Honours Winners
1990 Wild Thing (Vic)
1991 Ronstan Wild Thing (Vic)
1998 Longitude (Vic)
1999 Cadibarra 7 (Sole Finisher)
2000 Wild One
2001 Kontrol (Vic)
2002 Kontrol (Vic)
2003 Indec Merit
2004 Quetzalcoatl (Tas)
2005 Helsal II (Vic)
2006 No Fearr (Vic)
2007 Not run - Eastcoaster race run instead
2008 Shortwave (NSW)
2009 Jazz Player (Vic)
2010 Gusto (Vic)
2011 Extasea (Vic)
2012 Extasea (Vic)
2013 Extasea (Vic)
2014 Spirit of Downunder (Vic)
2015 Extasea (Vic)
2016 Cadibarra 8 (Vic) Skipper: Paul Roberts

Handicap Honours Winners (IRC)
2000 Anaconda (Vic)
2007 Not run - Eastcoaster race run instead
2008 Shortwave (NSW)
2009 Jazz Player (Vic)
2010 Enchantress (SA)
2011 Extasea (Vic)
2012 Bandit (Vic)
2013 Extasea (Vic)
2014 Seduction (Vic)
2015 Extasea (Vic)
2016 Cadibarra 8 (Vic) Skipper: Paul Roberts

Handicap Honours Winners (AMS)
1990 Paladin (Vic)
1997 Island Trader (Vic)
1998 Longitude (Vic)
1999 Cadibarra 7 (Vic)
2000 Tevake (Vic, Hobsons Bay Yacht Club, Angus Fletcher)
2001 Island Trader (Vic)
2002 Deja Blue (Vic)
2003 Wavelength (Vic)
2004 Under Capricorn (Vic)
2005 Quetzalcoatl (Tas)
2006 A Crewed Interest (Vic)
2007 Not run - Eastcoaster race run instead
2008 Tevake II (Vic, Hobsons Bay Yacht Club, Angus Fletcher)
2009 Alien (Vic)
2010 Enchantress (SA)
2011 Alien (Vic)
2012 Tevake II (Vic)
2013 Tevake II (Vic)
2014 Seduction (Vic)
2015 Extasea (Vic)
2016 Cadibarra 8 (Vic) Skipper: Paul Roberts

Handicap Honours Winners (PHD)
1997 Granny Apple (Vic)
1998 Tevake (Vic, Hobsons Bay Yacht Club, Angus Fletcher)
2000 Sea Eagle (Vic)
2001 San Miguel (Vic)
2002 Deja Blue (Vic)
2003 Rum Beat (Vic)
2004 Under Capricorn (Vic)
2005 By Order Of The Secretary (BOOTS) (Vic)
2006 A Crewed Interest (Vic)
2007 Not run - East Coast race run instead
2008 Spirit of Downunder (Vic)
2009 Jazz Player (Vic)
2010 Enchantress (SA)
2011 Alien (Vic)
2012 Tevake II (Vic)
2013 Tevake II (Vic)
2014 Seduction (Vic)
2015 Extasea (Vic)
2016 Cadibarra 8 (Vic) Skipper: Paul Roberts

References

Sailing competitions in Australia
Sports competitions in Melbourne
Sport in Hobart
Sailing in Tasmania
Sports competitions in Tasmania
Sports competitions in Victoria (Australia)